This Place Will Become Your Tomb is the second studio album by English rock band Sleep Token. Recorded at G1 Productions in Wells, Somerset, it was produced by George Lever, with whom the group had previously worked on their 2019 debut Sundowning. The album was released on 24 September 2021 by Spinefarm Records, preceded by the singles "Alkaline" in June, "The Love You Want" in August, and "Fall for Me" in September. This Place Will Become Your Tomb gave Sleep Token their first chart positions in the UK, reaching the top 40 of the UK Albums Chart and the top 20 of the Scottish Albums Chart.

Background
This Place Will Become Your Tomb was announced on 18 June 2021, accompanied by the release of "Alkaline" as the lead single and music video. In an official press release, it was claimed that the album "delves further into the enigmatic universe of Sleep Token, pushing boundaries and blurring genres, whilst retaining their signature sound". On the same day, the band performed on the Second Stage at the Download Festival Pilot, where they performed "Alkaline" live for the first time. This was followed on 6 August by "The Love You Want", and finally "Fall for Me" on 17 September, a week before the album's release.

As of March 2023, according to Setlist.fm, the song from This Place Will Become Your Tomb that Sleep Token have performed most often live is "Alkaline", which is ranked third overall; this is followed by "Hypnosis", "Like That" and "The Love You Want".

Reception

Commercial
This Place Will Become Your Tomb was Sleep Token's first release to chart, debuting at number 39 on the UK Albums Chart. In the midweek chart, it was slated to debut at number 11. The album also registered at number 12 on the UK Album Downloads Chart, number 11 on the UK Album Sales Chart, number 12 on the UK Physical Albums Chart, number 13 on the UK Vinyl Albums Chart, and number 13 on the Scottish Albums Chart.

Critical

Media response to This Place Will Become Your Tomb was generally positive. In a 10/10 review written for Distorted Sound magazine, Daniel Fella described the album as a "masterpiece", claiming that "It's unforgettable, unique and damn close to flawless ... music doesn't get much better than this". Daily Express columnist Callum Crumlish gave the album four out of five stars, praising the lyrical content as the band's best yet, as well as the band's development into other musical styles since Sundowning. Crumlish's few criticisms of the release included claims that "Some of the album's songs feel a little stretched" and that "Fall for Me" feels "out of place". Upset magazine also gave the album four out of five, writing that "It's full with great moments, but in between those are some jagged transitions of sounds that don't completely marry".

Kerrang! writer James MacKinnon gave This Place Will Become Your Tomb a rating of three out of five. He praised the album for presenting "compelling songs that we can relate to", highlighting "Alkaline", "Hypnosis" and "The Love You Want"; however, he added that much of the record "doesn't maintain [the same] level of inspiration", claiming that "failing to recognise when to wrap up a track still proves to be Sleep Token's Achilles' heel". Similarly, Harrison Smith for Gigwise complained that "the often lack of distinction between tracks ... detracts from the album's genre-blurring flow", although his review was generally positive about the range of lyrical themes and musical styles adopted. In contrast, Wepea Buntugu of The Line of Best Fit suggested that "flows smoothly from one song to the next, with just enough variety of melodies to stave off monotony while still maintaining a very distinct sound throughout". Under the Radar's Haydon Spenceley praised the album as "accessible".

Accolades
At the end of 2021, Distorted Sound magazine ranked This Place Will Become Your Tomb as the third best album of the year, behind only Trivium's In the Court of the Dragon and Spiritbox's Eternal Blue. Kerrang! ranked it at number 48 in its list of the 50 best albums of 2021, with Emma Wilkes hailing the release as "emotionally vivid" and praising all three singles plus "Hypnosis" as highlights. Metal Hammer ranked the album at number 14 in its end-of-year list. Eight writers for the magazine included the album in their top 20 lists, five of whom ranked it in their top 10. In a feature published shortly after the release of the first four singles from Take Me Back to Eden in January 2023, Metal Hammer included "Alkaline", "The Love You Want", "Fall for Me" and "Hypnosis" in its list of Sleep Token's best songs.

Track listing

Personnel
Vessel1 – vocals, guitar, keyboards, percussion
Vessel2 – drums
George Lever – production, engineering, bass
Sky Van Hoff – mixing, editing, synthesisers, programming

Charts

References

External links

2021 albums
Sleep Token albums
Spinefarm Records albums